Halictoxenos is a genus of insects belonging to the family Stylopidae.

The genus was first described by Pierce in 1908.

The species of this genus are found in Eurasia and Northern America.

Species:
 Halictoxenos borealis
 Halictoxenos spencei
 Halictoxenos tumulorum

References

Strepsiptera
Insect genera